Georg Hirth (13 July 1841 in Tonna – 28 March 1916 in Tegernsee) was a German writer, journalist and publisher. He is best known for founding the cultural magazine Jugend in 1896, which was instrumental in popularizing Art Nouveau.

Biography 
Hirth was born in Tonna, present-day Thuringia in 1841, studied to be an economist in Gotha and in Leipzig, and after a career working as a journalist he founded the magazine Jugend: Münchner illustrierte Wochenschrift für Kunst und Leben (Youth: the illustrated weekly magazine of art and lifestyle of Munich). This publication, which reflected the modernist ideals that were circulating at the time among artists, was instrumental in promoting the style of Art Nouveau in Germany. As a result, the magazine's name was adopted as the most common German-language term for the movement: Jugendstil ("Jugend-style"). Hirth also coined the term "Secession" to represent the spirit of the various modern and reactionary movements of the era.<ref>Nicolas Powell, "Review of C. Nebehay, Ver Sacrum, 1898–1903," The Burlington Magazine, vol. 118 (Sep. 1976): 660.</ref> He died in Tegernsee in 1916.

 Selected works 

Herausgeber: Tagebuch des deutsch-französischen Kriegs (Leipzig 1870–1874) – Diary of the Franco-Prussian WarDer Formenschatz der Renaissance (1877 ff., seit 1879 unter dem Titel Der Formenschatz) – published in English as Art TreasureDas deutsche Zimmer der Gotik und Renaissance etc. (3. Auflage 1886) – The German Gothic and Renaissance RoomKulturgeschichtliches Bilderbuch aus drei Jahrhunderten (1883 ff.) – published in English as Picture book of the graphic arts, 1500–1800Published a series of facsimile-reproductions of German woodcut prints and drawings by Albrecht Dürer, Hans Holbein the younger, Lucas Cranach the Elder, Jost Amman, Virgil Solis and others in the Liebhaber-Bibliothek alter Illustratoren'' (1880 ff.)

References

Bibliography 
Neue Deutsche Biographie, vol. 9, pp. 239–241, and vol. 12, p. 217

External links 
 

Art Nouveau
German editors
German art critics
German art historians
German art collectors
19th-century art collectors
20th-century art collectors
1841 births
1916 deaths
German male non-fiction writers